Hamilton is a city in, and the county seat of Harris County, Georgia, United States. It is part of the Columbus, Georgia-Alabama Metropolitan Statistical Area. The population was 1,680 at the 2020 census, up from 307 at the 2000 census. As of 2020 the population had risen to an estimated 1780.

History
Hamilton was founded in 1827 as seat of the newly formed Harris County. It was incorporated as a town in 1828 and as a city in 1903.

The city was named for U.S. Secretary of the Navy and governor of South Carolina Paul Hamilton (1762-1816).

The January, 1912 alleged lynching of a black woman and three black men in Hamilton attracted national attention from the press and widespread outrage. Dusky Crutchfield, Eugene Harrington, Burrell Hardaway, and Johnnie Moore had been held for questioning in the murder of a white landowner. They had never even been arrested. Some people took them outside town, then allegedly hanged and shot them. While some families tried to build walls of silence around the murders, the effects of these crimes were long-lasting. Coverage by local newspapers at the time suggested the four were guilty. The Montgomery Advertiser did not even report their names correctly.

In January, 2021, The City of Hamilton fired Police Chief Gene Allmond and Another Patrol Officer for racial remarks discovered on Police Body Camera. Months of National Media Coverage followed for the City.

In April, 2021, after an extensive search for a new Police Chief, City Officials appointed Eric Weiss as Chief of Police.

Geography
Hamilton is located slightly northeast of the center of Harris County at  (32.764669, -84.873103). U.S. Route 27 runs through the city from north to south, leading southwest  to Columbus and north  to Pine Mountain. Georgia State Route 116 intersects U.S. Route 27 in the city for a very short concurrency. The city is located at the southern base of the Pine Mountain Range in the Piedmont region of the state.

Demographics

As of the census of 2010, there were 1,016 people, 339 households, and 179 families residing in the city. The racial makeup of the city was 65.35% White, 32.68% African American, 1.63% Asian, 0.33% from other races, and 0.33% from two or more races. Hispanic or Latino of any race were 0.33% of the population.

There were 131 households, out of which 35.1% had children under the age of 18 living with them, 42.0% were married couples living together, 19.1% had a female householder with no husband present, and 36.6% were non-families. 34.4% of all households were made up of individuals, and 20.6% had someone living alone who was 65 years of age or older.  The average household size was 2.34 and the average family size was 3.00.

In the city, the population was spread out, with 27.4% under the age of 18, 5.5% from 18 to 24, 25.7% from 25 to 44, 22.5% from 45 to 64, and 18.9% who were 65 years of age or older.  The median age was 39 years. For every 100 females, there were 89.5 males.  For every 100 females age 18 and over, there were 78.4 males.

The median income for a household in the city was $32,143, and the median income for a family was $38,750. Males had a median income of $28,750 versus $32,083 for females. The per capita income for the city was $18,292.  About 5.2% of families and 12.4% of the population were below the poverty line, including 9.6% of those under the age of eighteen and 21.8% of those 65 or over.

Education 
The city is home to three of the seven schools in the county:
Park Elementary School
Harris County Carver Middle School
Harris County High School

Photo gallery

References

External links
 City of Hamilton official website
 Columbus Baptist Association historical marker

See also
National Register of Historic Places listings in Harris County, Georgia

Cities in Georgia (U.S. state)
Cities in Harris County, Georgia
County seats in Georgia (U.S. state)
Columbus metropolitan area, Georgia
Populated places established in 1827
1827 establishments in Georgia (U.S. state)